Darrell Nicholson (born August 23, 1959) is a former American football linebacker. After a career at North Carolina, where he earned first-team All-Atlantic Coast Conference honors in 1980 when the Tar Heels finished 11–1 and won the ACC with a 6–0 record, Nicholson was selected by the New York Giants in the 1982 NFL Draft. After only one season, he joined the Toronto Argonauts and helped the team win the 71st Grey Cup.

In his junior season at UNC, where he was a teammate of Lawrence Taylor, Nicholson led the Tar Heels in tackles with 75 solos and 42 assists. He had been the ACC Rookie of the Year in 1978.

His sons A. J. Nicholson and Derek Nicholson played for the Florida State Seminoles.

References 

1959 births
Living people
American football linebackers
Canadian football linebackers
American players of Canadian football
North Carolina Tar Heels football players
Toronto Argonauts players
New York Giants players
Players of American football from North Carolina
Calgary Stampeders players
Ottawa Rough Riders players